WTCJ (1230 AM) is an American radio station licensed to serve the community of Tell City, Indiana. The station is owned and operated by Hancock Communications, Inc., doing business as the Cromwell Radio Group, and the station's broadcast license is held by Hancock Communications, Inc.

WTCJ broadcasts an Adult hits format.

The station was assigned the call sign "WTCJ" by the Federal Communications Commission (FCC).

Previous logos

References

External links
WTCJ official website

TCJ
Adult hits radio stations in the United States
Perry County, Indiana